Tunnel (also referred as The Tunnel;  Teoneol) is a 2016 South Korean survival drama film written and directed by Kim Seong-hun, starring Ha Jung-woo in the lead role. The film revolves around a car salesman who gets trapped when a poorly constructed tunnel collapses, and deals with his survival inside the tunnel with the advice of the rescue team head. It was released in South Korea on 10 August 2016.

Synopsis
Lee Jung-soo (Ha Jung-woo) is driving home for his daughter's birthday. While driving through a tunnel through a mountain, the tunnel collapses. When Lee Jung-Soo regains consciousness, he finds himself trapped inside his car, which is buried under tons of concrete and debris. All he has inside the car are his cellphone, two bottles of water, and his daughter's birthday cake.

South Korea is horrified by the news of the collapse of a large tunnel. The government urgently sets up an accident task force. Daekyung (Oh Dal-su), the rescue captain of the accident task force, makes various attempts to enter the tunnel, but the structure is only slow. Meanwhile, Jeong-su's wife Se-hyun (Bae Doo-na) delivers hope to her husband through the radio, which Jung-su can only hear, and does not give up hope for his safe life. The sluggish rescue operation will eventually cause a major setback in the completion of the second tunnel nearby, and public opinion begins to divide over the survival and structure of the essence.

Production
Many audiences who watched the movie said that it was reminiscent of the Sinking of MV Sewol in 2014. However, the film was based on an original novel published before the MV Sewol incident. Director Kim Sung-hoon said in an interview, "It (sinking of MV Sewol) was such a big pain and the production team was also very sick." "Since the sadness is still valid, I couldn't help but think of the sinking of MV Sewol when I made the disaster material film, but I thought it was impossible to exclude the memory and take it." On the one hand, " one incident rather than focusing on pursuant to a huge disaster happened, and universal since the system should be run by him collapsed."and some by a man trapped in it" want to say things like dignity for the life situation."

Although ‘Tunnel’ is doing a lot of box office hits, some pointed out its regret. The somewhat optimistic attitude of ‘Tunnel’ is not realistic. It may be because after the disaster of Ferry Sewol, Korean audiences witnessed how the social system of disaster works. The director explained that he also saw such opinions. He said in an interview, "There were some opinions that want me to be more directly explained. However, I hoped that this movie would not be a movie that only people who are angry about such a disaster would watch. Some movies portray social evil and get angry with the system, and they can scratch people's emotions like that." He also continued to add the last sentence. "I wanted the movie to be more sympathetic to pain. I think what we are doing the most is the lack of ability to empathize with other people's pain."

The director added, "I put a lot of effort into organizing the tunnel set in the movie." As the inside of the collapsed tunnel continues to appear, he wanted to devise the most realistic part of the movie. "One of the words that can describe this movie is its texture. I thought the texture should not look fake. For Jeong-su, the tunnel is like an actor. The actors and the space have to give and receive reactions from each other." he said. In the set, the real concrete part and the fake part were mixed together. He made a fake one on the close side of the actor and put a real one on the real one on the far side. Fake materials are not only concrete, but also cement-finished stones. As dust powder, grain powder, charcoal powder, and jade powder were all used. It is said that it was because the actual cement powder could be dangerous if inhaled by an actor, as the dust was scattered throughout the movie.

Cast

 Ha Jung-woo as Lee Jung-soo
One of the survivors of the ‘Hado’ Tunnel collapse. He works as a dealer for Kia Motors, drives a Kia Optima operated from Kia, and has a wife and a daughter who goes to kindergarten. He is known to have good business skills, good relationships, and a generous personality. He distributes water that is not enough to drink alone to other survivors, and shares little food with his dog.

 Bae Doona as Se-hyun
Jeong-su's wife. Younger than her husband. If Jeong-su represents the disaster victims, Se-hyun represents the victims' relatives, bereaved families, and secondary victims. After the accident, she volunteers at the scene and talks with the rescue team leader to maintain the hope of Jeong-su, but the rescue operation is delayed than expected and she is baptized with raw eggs by the mother of the work leader who died in the accident.

 Oh Dal-su as Dae-kyung
119 Rescue Team Leader. He was a rather serious figure as the "expert" of the original, but Oh Dal-soo's role in the movie added to his comic. He is the most conscientious and professional person in the work as a veteran rescue leader. Except for Jeong-su's family, this person and the work leader are the only ones who really believed in Jeong-su's survival and tried to rescue him until the end. He did not provide any direct help to Jeong-su, but he also gave him the advice he needed to survive in the early stages.

 Nam Ji-hyun as Mi-na
One of the victims of the ‘Hado’ Tunnel collapse with Jeong-su. She is also the owner of the dog, Taeng.

 Kim Hae-sook as government Minister
 Park Hyuk-kwon as government official
 Park Jin-woo  as government aide
 Lee Sang-hee as YTN news reporter
 Kim Jong-soo as drilling company executive (cameo)
 Shin Jung-keun as Captain Kang
 Cho Hyun-chul as young guy with spectacles in rescue team
 Yoo Seung-mok as reporter Jo
 Lee Dong-jin as radio DJ
 Lee Cheol-min as Captain of drilling team
 Han Sung-chun as drone technician
 Kim Seung-hoon as public hearing moderator
 Ye Soo-jung as old mother
 Jin Yong-ok as construction worker A
 Lee Dong-yong as construction worker B
 Joo Suk-tae as employee of Korea Expressway Corporation
 Ahn Se-ho as drilling team member
 Seo Hyun-woo as SNC fellow reporter
 Kang Shin-chul as agent at situation
 Kim Soo-jin as Public hearing attendee B
 Jin Seon-kyu as equipment manager
 Yeo Min-gyu as voice of 119 telephone operator, helicopter agent
 Kim Sung-kyu as Civic group member 3
 Choi Gwi-hwa as person interested in tunnel 2 (cameo)
 Jung Suk-yong as Team Leader Choi (cameo)
 Hwang Byeng-gug as gas station owner (cameo)
 Bae Yoo-ram as 119 rescue worker (cameo)

Reception

Awards and nominations

References

External links
 
 Tunnel (Teoneol) (2016) at Rotten Tomatoes

2016 films
2016 action drama films
2010s disaster films
2010s Korean-language films
South Korean disaster films
South Korean thriller films
South Korean action drama films
2016 thriller films
Showbox films
2010s survival films
Films directed by Kim Seong-hun
2010s South Korean films